Jaak Peetre (29 July 1935, Tallinn – 1 April 2019, Lund) was an Estonian-born Swedish mathematician. He is known for the Peetre theorem and Peetre's inequality.

Biography
Jaak Peetre's father was Arthur Peetre (1907–1989), an Estonian jurist, historian, archivist, and from 1941 to 1942 mayor of Pärnu. Jaak Peetre went to Sweden with his parents and brother in 1944. At Lund University he graduated with BSc in 1956 and PhD in 1959. His thesis advisor was Åke Pleijel. At Lund University, Peetre was an assistant professor from 1956 to 1959, an associate professor from 1960 to 1963, and full professor from 1963 to 1988. He was briefly in 1988 a visiting professor at the University of Madrid and was from 1988 to 1992 a visiting professor at Stockholm University. At Lund University he was a lecturer from 1993 to 1997, an assistant professor from 1997 to 2000, and professor emeritus from 2000. He was also a visiting professor at New York University for the academic year 1960–1961 and at University of Maryland for the academic year 1961–1962.

Peetre's research deals with ordinary and partial derivative differential equations, operator interpolation spaces, singular integrals and Besov spaces, differential geometry, Clifford analysis, Fock space and Hankel operators, Fourier and harmonic analysis. Bernard Malgrange, Jacques-Louis Lions, and Peetre were pioneers of modern interpolation theory. In the early 1990s, Peetre's research focused on multilinear forms, especially trilinear forms. He was the author or coauthor of more than 230 research papers. He was the thesis advisor for 8 doctoral students. In 1970 he was an Invited Speaker at the International Congress of Mathematicians in Nice. He gave lectures at more than 30 international mathematical congresses and conferences and in many cases was among the organizers. He was a member of the editorial boards of several international mathematical journals.

In 1984 he was elected a member of the Swedish Royal Academy of Sciences. From 1984 to 1987 he was the president of the Swedish Mathematical Society. In 1998 he was awarded the Royal Society of Sciences in Uppsala's Celsius Gold Medal.

Jaak Peetre was the most prolific Estonian mathematician of his era, often visiting Estonia and giving lectures there. In 1994 he was a founding member of the Estonian Mathematical Society. In 2001 he was awarded the Order of the White Star, 3rd Class. In 2008 he was elected a foreign member of the Estonian Academy of Science.

Selected publications

Articles
 
 
 
 
  (Over 900 citations)

Books
  (See Edgar Krahn.)

References

Further reading
 Eesti entsüklopeedia (Estonian Encyclopedia) 14, 364
 Eesti teadlased väljaspool kodumaad: biograafiline teatmik (Estonian scholars and scientists abroad: biographical directory). Stockholm, 1984, 91 
 Eesti teaduse biograafiline leksikon. 3. köide: N–Sap TTEÜ, avaldatud elekrooniliselt 2013

1935 births
2019 deaths
Estonian mathematicians
Swedish mathematicians
Mathematical analysts
PDE theorists
Recipients of the Order of the White Star, 3rd Class
Lund University alumni
Academic staff of Lund University
Estonian emigrants to Sweden
Estonian World War II refugees
People from Tallinn
Members of the Royal Swedish Academy of Sciences